Kush Bhagat (born 11 June 2009) is an Indian chess player with an International FIDE Rating. His current and the peak rating is 2302. He is a Student at South Mumbai Chess Academy, trained by Balaji Guttula.

Early life and education 
Kush Bhagat was born on 11 June 2009, in Mumbai, Maharashtra to Karan Bhagat, an Indian Entrepreneur and Shilpa Bhagat, who is a former Mrs. India World 2013. Kush has a twin sister Kyra Bhagat.

Kush Bhagat is in 8th grade, currently studying at the American School of Bombay.

Chess career 
First Indian to win Triple Gold in an official Asian championship. Kush's live rating is an astonishing 2302 Elo points.

On 1 September 2022, his rank among the 13-year-olds was 3rd in India and 20th in the world.

1st Western Asian Youth Championship-Al Ain, UAE 2016.
Triple gold in U-7 boys classical, rapid, and blitz formats and was awarded Candidate Master (CM) title.
World School Chess Championship- Sochi, Russia 2016, International blitz chess championship, U-7 boys 1st place.
Won the u-9 National School Championship, Bhubaneshwar held in 2018.
He beat Grandmaster Vladimir Okhotnik at the age of 10 in a tournament held in Germany in 2019.
Won gold in the prestigious MSSA Chess Championship 2022, U-14 Boys
Won gold in the prestigious MSSA Chess Championship 2017/2018, U-10 Boys 
Secured Gold in Maharashtra state U-7 chess championship 2016 held in Mumbai.
Secured Silver in Maharashtra state schools chess championship under-7, 2016.
Won Silver in the 10th Asian school chess championship 2014 Taiwan. U-5.
Leca open, 31 July to 5 August 2022 Portugal, 1st place in the 1800–1999 rating category and 1st place in the Under-14 category.
Participated in Cannes open Category A in France.
Won the Koege long sommer championship 2022 in Copenhagen, Denmark from 6 to 10 July 2022.

References 

Indian chess players
2009 births
Living people